Kazimierz Suchorzewski (born 14 January 1895, date of death unknown) was a Polish sports shooter. He competed in the 25 m pistol event at the 1936 Summer Olympics.

References

External links
 

1895 births
Year of death missing
Polish male sport shooters
Olympic shooters of Poland
Shooters at the 1936 Summer Olympics
People from Ostrołęka County
Polish legionnaires (World War I)
Polish people of the Polish–Soviet War
20th-century Polish people